Endomychidae, or handsome fungus beetles, is a family of beetles with representatives found in all biogeographic realms. There are around 120 genera and 1300 species. The family was established based on the type genus Endomychus, a genus erected in 1795 by Panzer which was applied to a species that Linnaeus called Chrysomela coccinea. As the common name suggests, Endomychidae feed on fungi. Crowson, in his influential treatment of the beetles, placed the family within the Cucujoidea. They have a tarsal formal of 4-4-4 or 3-3-3 and the wings lack a closed radial cell. The second antennal segment has a sensory appendage that is as long as the third antennal segment. The family has also been grouped with the Coccinellidae in a group called the Trimera for having pseudotrimerous tarsi. A 2015 molecular phylogeny study found that the Cucujoidea were found to be non-monophyletic and the Endomychidae was refined with the removal of the Anamorphinae from within the family and elevated to the status of a full family, Anamorphidae. Mycetaeinae and Eupsilobiinae were also found not to belong within the clades of the core Endomychidae, and likewise reclassified into the families Mycetaeidae and Eupsilobiidae.

The subfamilies that are included:
 Danascelinae
 Endomychinae (including Stenotarsinae)
 Epipocinae
 Leiestinae
 Lycoperdininae
 Merophysiinae
 Pleganophorinae
 Xenomycetinae

Genera
These 70 genera belong to the family Endomychidae as defined in the past (due to revisions, this may not be entirely accurate):

 Acinaces Gerstaecker, 1858 g
 Aclemmysa Reitter, 1904 g
 Agaricophilus Motschulsky, 1838 g
 Amphisternus Germar, 1843 g
 Amphistethus Strohecker, 1964 g
 Ancylopus Costa, 1854 g
 Anidrytus Gerstaecker, 1858 i c g
 Aphorista Gorham, 1873 i c g b
 Archipines Strohecker, 1953 i c g
 Asymbius Gorham, 1896 g
 Atopomychus Tomaszewska & Szawaryn, 2013 g
 Atrichonota Arrow, 1925 g
 Avencymon Strohecker, 1971 g
 Beccariola Arrow, 1943 g
 Bolbomorphus Gorham, 1888 g
 Brachytrycherus Arrow, 1920 g
 Bystodes Strohecker, 1953 g
 Cholovocera Motschulsky, 1838 g
 Chondria Gorham, 1888 g
 Corynomalus Chevrolat in Dejean, 1836 i c g
 Cyclotoma Mulsant, 1851 i g
 Danae Reiche, 1847 i c g b
 Danascelis Tomaszewska, 1999 i c g
 Dapsa Latreille, 1829 g
 Dexialia Sasaji, 1970 g
 Dialexia Gorham, 1891 g
 Discolomopsis Shockley, 2006 g
 Displotera Reitter, 1877 g
 Ectomychus Gorham, 1888 g
 Eidorus g
 Endomychus Panzer, 1795 i c g b
 Ephebus Chevrolat in Dejean, 1836 i c g
 Epipocus Germar, 1843 i c g b
 Epopterus Chevrolat in Dejean, 1836 i c g
 Eucteanus Gerstaecker, 1857 g
 Eucymon g
 Eumorphus Weber, 1801 g
 Geoendomychus Lea, 1922 g
 Glesirhanis Shockley & Alekseev, 2014 g
 Hadromychus Bousquet & Leschen, 2002 i c g b
 Holoparamecus Curtis, 1833 i c g b
 Hylaia Guerin, 1857 g
 Hylaperdina Tomaszewska, 2012 g
 Idiophyes Blackburn, 1896 g
 Indalmus Gerstaecker, 1858 g
 Leiestes Chevrolat, 1836 g
 Lycoperdina Latreille, 1807 i c g b
 Meilichius Gerstaecker, 1857 g
 Merophysia Lucas, 1852 g
 Microxenus Wallaston, 1861 g
 Mycetina Mulsant, 1846 i c g b
 Mychothenus Strohecker, 1953 g
 Natalinus Tomaszewska, 2011 g
 Ohtaius Chûjô, 1938 g
 Palaeoestes Kirejtshuk & Nel, 2009 g
 Paniegena Heller, 1916 g
 Parasymbius Arrow, 1920 g
 Phymaphora Newman, 1838 i c g b
 Phymaphoroides Motschoulsky, 1857 g
 Pleganophorus Hampe, 1855 g
 Polymus Mulsant, 1846 g
 Pseudindalmus Arrow, 1920 g
 Rhanidea Strohecker, 1953 i c g b
 Saula Gerstaecker, 1858 i c g
 Sinocymbachus Strohecker & Chujo, 1970 g
 Stenotarsus Perty, 1832 i c g b
 Stethorhanis Blaisdell, 1931 i c g
 Trochoideus Westwood, 1833 i c g b
 Trycherus Gerstaecker, 1857 g
 Xenomycetes Horn, 1880 i c g b

Data sources: i = ITIS, c = Catalogue of Life, g = GBIF, b = Bugguide.net

Fossil genera 

 Burmalestes Tomaszewska and Ślipiński, 2018  Burmese amber, Myanmar, Late Cretaceous (Cenomanian)
 Cretolestes Tomaszewska, Ślipiński and Ren, 2018 Burmese amber, Myanmar, Cenomanian
 Cretaparamecus Tomaszewska, Ślipiński, Bai and Zhang, 2018 Burmese amber, Myanmar, Cenomanian
 Palaeomycetes Tomaszewska, Ślipiński and Ren, 2018 Burmese amber, Myanmar, Cenomanian
 Zemyna Tomaszewska, 2018 (replaced name Laima Alekseev and Tomaszewska, 2018): Baltic amber, Eocene

References

External links 

 
Coccinelloidea
Polyphaga families